Marco Vinicio Juárez Fierro (born 29 May 1976) is a Mexican politician from the Institutional Revolutionary Party. From 2002 to 2003 he served as Deputy of the LVIII Legislature of the Mexican Congress representing the State of Mexico.

References

1976 births
Living people
Politicians from Mexico City
Institutional Revolutionary Party politicians
21st-century Mexican politicians
Deputies of the LVIII Legislature of Mexico
Members of the Chamber of Deputies (Mexico) for the State of Mexico